Liudmila "Emily" Zamourka (née Grekova; born 1967/1968) is a Moldovan-American singer and musician. She came to prominence in late September 2019 after an LAPD officer filmed and posted a video of her singing a Puccini aria at Wilshire/Normandie station. The video subsequently became popular over social media.

Overview
In 1991 Zamourka moved from Moldova to the United States and became homeless in Los Angeles for two years when she suffered serious health problems and had to pay for her medical bills. The artist, who taught lessons in piano and violin, was forced to take up numerous jobs. She also said she ended up in the streets two or three years ago after an unknown vandal stole and destroyed her violin and with it her means of making money. Five GoFundMe pages helped Zamourka get off the streets and get her a new violin surpassed $80,000 towards the goal of $85,000. Since her subway singing, Zamourka performed at the unveiling of the Historic Little Italy sign in downtown San Pedro on Saturday October 5, 2019 before a live audience that praised her with uproarious applause. She performed there only one song: the same Puccini aria she sang on the viral video.

Future
On October 3, 2019, two time Grammy nominated record producer Joel Diamond publicly offered Zamourka a recording contract.

See also
Ted Williams

References

1960s births
21st-century American singers
21st-century American women singers
21st-century Moldovan singers
21st-century Moldovan women singers
Homeless people
Living people
Moldovan expatriates in the United States
Singers from Los Angeles